Aerosmith Video Scrapbook is a video by American rock band Aerosmith, featuring live footage, promotional videos, and conversations between the band and their families. It was released on VHS in 1987 and laserdisc in 1990. There has yet to be a DVD release. In February 1988 the RIAA certified the release as Gold (Longform video).

"I can dance better now than I did back then because I was so stoned," singer Steven Tyler reflected in 1994. "I've watched the 'Sweet Emotion' footage where I just stood there because I was gacked up to the nines."

Track listing 
 "Toys In The Attic (Live at Pontiac Silverdome 1976)"
 "Same Old Song and Dance (Live at Pontiac Silverdome 1976)"
 "Chip Away the Stone (Live at Capital Center - Largo, MD 1978)"
 "Draw The Line (Live at California Jam 2 1978)"
 "Dream On"
 "Sweet Emotion (Live at Pontiac Silverdome 1976)"
 "Chiquita (Music Video)"
 "Lightning Strikes (Music Video)"
 "Walk This Way (Live at Pontiac Silverdome 1976)"
 "Adam's Apple" (Live at Pontiac Silverdome 1976)"
 "Train Kept A Rollin' (Live at Pontiac Silverdome 1976)"
 "SOS (Unlisted Track) (Live at Pontiac Silverdome 1976)"

Personnel
Tom Hamilton
Joey Kramer
Joe Perry
Steven Tyler
Brad Whitford
Jimmy Crespo
Rick Dufay

Certifications

References

Aerosmith video albums
1987 video albums
Music video compilation albums
1987 compilation albums
Aerosmith compilation albums